Regulate may refer to:

 Regulation
 Regulate...G Funk Era, an album from rapper Warren G
 Regulate (song), title song from the album

See also
 
 
 Regulator (disambiguation)
 Regulation (disambiguation)